That's the Way Love Is may refer to:

That's the Way Love Is (album), a 1970 album by Marvin Gaye
"That's the Way Love Is" (The Isley Brothers song), a 1967 song by The Isley Brothers, later covered by The Temptations and Marvin Gaye
"That's the Way Love Is" (Bobby Bland song), a 1963 song by Bobby Bland
"That's the Way Love Is" (Ten City song), a 1989 song by Ten City
"That's the Way Love Is" (Bobby Brown song), a 1993 song by Bobby Brown

See also
That's the Way Love Goes (disambiguation)